Baltiysk (also Noytif) was a military air base in Baltiysk, Kaliningrad Oblast, Russia.

Originally constructed in the 1930s by Nazi Germany for the Luftwaffe, it was unused during World War II but was damaged by Allied bombings. In 1945 after the war ended, the air base came into possession of the Soviet Union and entered limited service with the Soviet Air Force, who used the remains of the air base to house a small number of interceptor alert pads.

The base was home to the 509th Independent Aviation Squadron Helicopters between 1955 and 1958 and the 49th Independent Anti-Submarine Aviation Squadron between 1948 and 1995.

In 1957 Western intelligence identified 25 Mikoyan-Gurevich MiG-15 (ASCC: Fagot) jet fighters based at Baltiysk.  By the early 1960s, Baltiysk had become a reserve airfield, and intelligence missions no longer observed any aircraft the airfield.

The Baltiysk/Noytif Seaplane Base operated in the harbor on the northeast side of the airfield until the 1970s.  It had five hangars adjoining the waters. The Beriev Be-6 (Madge) was one type of seaplane observed at this base.

The Baltiysk airfield complex was deactivated in the 1990s following the dissolution of the Soviet Union, and has since been abandoned.

References

External links
RussianAirFields.com

Soviet Air Force bases
Soviet Naval Aviation bases
Soviet Air Defence Force bases